Matteo Civitali (1436–1501) was an Italian Renaissance sculptor and architect, painter and engineer from Lucca. He was a leading artistic personality of the Early Renaissance in Lucca, where he was born and where most of his work remains.

Biography
He was trained in Florence, where Antonio Rossellino and Mino da Fiesole influenced his mature style. He is known to have sculpted statues of Adam, Eve, Abraham, Saints Zacchariah and Elizabeth, and others for the chapel of San Giovanni Battista in Genoa Cathedral. He is mentioned with the name of Matteo Civitali by Vasari in his biography of Jacopo della Quercia, and appears to have taken up the art of sculpture at the age of 40 years, after years of practicing as a "barber" (surgeon). While considered to be the most important marble sculptor outside Florence during the second half of the fifteenth century, historical evidence pointed to Civitali's activity as a painter as well. However, no painting could firmly be identified to him until the discovery of an original contract by Roberto Ciardi in 1997 for a triptych for the Church of San Michele di Antraccoli,which was formerly ascribed to the Master of Benabbio. The contract revealed that both Civitali and Baldassare di Biagio were commissioned to complete the altarpiece.

Civitali's freestanding chapel, the "tempietto", built in 1484 to enshrine the Holy Face of Lucca, stands in the left nave of the Cathedral of San Martino, Lucca. The Duomo contains also a virtual anthology of Matteo's sculpture, since he worked at the San Romano Altar, and also sculpted the statue of St Sebastian in the back of the Holy Face Shrine, and two monumental graves in the right transept.

The relief of Faith (now in the National Museum of Florence, Italy) was originally the first segment part of Hope and Love, a triple relief. This marble figure of Faith was acquired by the Uffizi Gallery in 1830 from the prior of a church at Paterno near Florence.  This piece of work existed in the church of San Michele in Foro, Lucca.

Matteo Civitali died on 12 October 1501. His son Nicolao Civitali as a sculptor and architect in Lucca.

References and sources

References

Sources
"Matteo Civitali and his time" Exhibition, Villa Guinigi, Lucca, 2004.
Triptych of The Virgin and Child with Saints attributed to Matteo Civitali and Baldassarre di Biagio is in the collection of the Museum & Gallery, Inc. in Greenville, SC. 
Harms, Martina, Matteo Civitali, Bildhauer der Fruhrenaissance in Lucca (Beitrage zur Kunstgeschichte des Mittelalters und der Renaissance, 1) Münster: Rhema-Verlag, 1995. . Comprehensive monograph.

External links

Italian Renaissance architects
Italian Renaissance sculptors
1436 births
1502 deaths
Architects from Lucca
Artists from Lucca
15th-century Italian architects
15th-century Italian sculptors
Italian male sculptors
Catholic sculptors